The Sphinx is a mountain in the southernmost Coast Mountains of British Columbia, Canada. It is southeast of Garibaldi Lake.

Climate

Based on the Köppen climate classification, The Sphinx is located in a marine west coast climate zone of western North America. Most weather fronts originate in the Pacific Ocean, and travel east toward the Coast Mountains where they are forced upward by the range (Orographic lift), causing them to drop their moisture in the form of rain or snowfall. As a result, the Coast Mountains experience high precipitation, especially during the winter months in the form of snowfall.

References

 The Sphinx in the Canadian Mountain Encyclopedia

Two-thousanders of British Columbia
Garibaldi Ranges
New Westminster Land District